The acronym RSAF may refer to: 

Republic of Singapore Air Force
Royal Saudi Air Force
Royal Small Arms Factory, a defunct rifle factory in the United Kingdom
Republic of South Africa Air Force